Xylophanes libya, the Libya sphinx, is a moth of the family Sphingidae. The species was first described by Herbert Druce in 1878. It is known from southern Texas, Mexico, Belize, Guatemala, Panama and from Venezuela south and west to Bolivia and Paraguay.

Description 
The wingspan is 68–74 mm. The first postmedian line on the forewing upperside is double and the fourth postmedian line is heavier than the others, which are equally developed. Most individuals have a black dot in the discal cell and a black subapical costal spot. The forewing underside is more heavily marked black and brown than Xylophanes loelia and Xylophanes neoptolemus. The ground colour is uniform beyond the brown basal patch. The first postmedian line arising from the brown basal patch area is interrupted at the veins. The fourth postmedian line consists of a row of vein spots. There is a conspicuous black subapical spot present. The hindwing upperside is dark brown or black. The median band is pale orange pink, parallel sided along most of its length. The hindwing underside is more heavily marked black and brown than Xylophanes loelia and Xylophanes neoptolemus and has two postmedian lines, the inner more marked and formed by a series of spots.

Biology 
Adults are probably on wing year round in part of the range. In southern Texas, adults are on wing in October and in Bolivia in April.

The larvae feed on Psychotria horizontalis, Psychotria nervosa and Psychotria microdon. They are dark with yellow eyes with large dark black centers. The last two instars have a large blue dot in the eyes. There is a black pupil in the center of each eye, a patterned iris, and a faint yellow eyespot. The tail has the form of a straight spike needle in the last dark brown instar.

References

libya
Moths described in 1878